Jacksonville High School is the name of several high schools in the United States:

 Jacksonville High School (Alabama), Jacksonville, Alabama
 Jacksonville High School (Arkansas), Jacksonville, Arkansas
 Jacksonville High School (Illinois), Jacksonville, Illinois
 Jacksonville High School (North Carolina), Jacksonville, North Carolina
 Jacksonville High School (Jacksonville, Texas)